Matti Taneli Vanhanen (born 4 November 1955) is a Finnish politician who served as Prime Minister of Finland from 2003 to 2010. He was also Chairman of the Centre Party and President of the European Council in 2006. In his earlier career, he was a journalist. Vanhanen is the son of professor Tatu Vanhanen and Anni Tiihonen.

Career
Vanhanen studied political science at the University of Helsinki, graduating as a Master of Social Sciences in 1989. He was chairman of the Centre Party Youth League from 1980 to 1983. He also served as a member of the Espoo City Council from 1981 to 1984. Vanhanen used to work as a journalist. He was an editor (1985–1988) and editor-in-chief (1988–1991) at the local newspaper Kehäsanomat. In a column in Suomenmaa (the Centre Party's organ), he strongly condemned the Baltic Star pro-Estonian independence demonstration held in Helsinki in July 1985, calling the demonstration "provocative".

Vanhanen was elected to the Finnish Parliament (Eduskunta) in 1991. As a member of Parliament he was interested in ecological issues. For instance, Vanhanen spoke against the building of a fifth nuclear power plant in 1992, at the same time as serving on the board of electricity corporation Fortum. He served on the Parliamentary Environment Committee 1991–1995, and was chair of the Parliamentary Grand Committee 2000–2001. He was vice-chair of the Centre Party Parliamentary group 1994–2001, and Deputy Chairman of the Centre Party 2000–2003.

Another important topic for Vanhanen was Finland's foreign and security policy. As a specialist on the European Union he was a member of the European Union Constitutional Convention. There he criticised the president of the convention, former French president Valéry Giscard d'Estaing, as authoritarian. Vanhanen has said that he is unenthusiastic about European co-operation, and that he is an "EU pragmatist", so he may be considered a eurosceptic, especially when compared to his EU-enthusiast predecessor Paavo Lipponen.

Vanhanen served as Chairman of the Youth Foundation from 1998 to 2003 and Deputy chairman from 1981 to 1997. The prosecution claims the Youth Foundation donated under the direction of Centre Party MP Antti Kaikkonen funding of over 90,000 euros for his own campaign and that of other Centre Party MPs including Matti Vanhanen. Prosecutors say this contravened the Foundation's own rules and laws governing such institutions.

Vanhanen's first cabinet
Vanhanen resigned from the Constitutional Convention in 2003 when he became Minister of Defense in the cabinet of Prime Minister Anneli Jäätteenmäki. After Jäätteenmäki's resignation, Vanhanen was elected Prime Minister and his first cabinet was formed.

As a politician, Vanhanen is considered to be part of the liberal wing of the old agrarian Central Party, along with the two other Party ministers from Uusimaa region. His government cut the top state income tax rate from 35.5% to 33.5% in 2005 and 32.5% in 2006 (resulting in approximately 55% total tax rate after local government and social security taxes). The corporate tax rate was also lowered to 26% and capital gains to 28% (both formerly 29%), though at the same time dividends were partially made taxable.

Presidential candidate

As the Centre Party candidate, Vanhanen challenged President Tarja Halonen in the 2006 Finnish presidential election. He received 18.6% of the vote, coming third to the National Coalition Party's Sauli Niinistö (24.1%) and Social Democrat and incumbent Tarja Halonen (46.3%), and thus did not qualify for the runoff. Vanhanen expressed his support for Niinistö in the runoff election against his coalition partner's candidate Halonen.

The presidential election, and co-operation between Centre Party and National Coalition Party, proved to be a major strain on the government coalition between the Centre Party and Social Democrats. The flashpoint came in March, when the Centre Party demanded national agricultural subsidies to cover farmers' losses when the Finnish exception in the European Union's Common Agricultural Policy was about to expire. At the end of the crisis Vanhanen told his parliamentary group that taxpayers would cover ninety percent or about 100 million euros in losses.

Matti Vanhanen received 25,000 euros for his presidential election campaign in 2006 from Ahti Vilppula via his company Helsingin Mekaanikkotalo. Mekaanikkotalo is owned by Procomex in Luxembourg and further by Kilbrin Investments Limited in the Virgin Islands. In 2009 it was found out that this finance was not included in the finance announcement.

Vanhanen's second cabinet

After the March 2007 election the Centre Party narrowly remained the largest party after losing four seats. However their coalition partner, the SDP, lost eight seats and the centre-right National Coalition Party gained ten. Vanhanen's second cabinet was formed on a centre-right basis, with minor partners the Green League and the Swedish People's Party.

A scandal involving Vanhanen's second cabinet began rolling in May 2008, after the leader of the Centre Party's parliamentary group Timo Kalli said publicly that he would not reveal information about his campaign finances, because such disclosure was not required. After a media backlash, Kalli gave up his secrecy and listed a group of businessmen known as "Kehittyvien maakuntien Suomi" (KMS; in English, "The Finland of Developing Regions"), who had financed the Centre Party. Centre Party links with KMS were suspected, as one address of the organisation belonged to a party official. It was later revealed that the organisation had been formed in the Centre Party's general secretary's office.

After the Russian response to the Georgian invasion of South Ossetia, Vanhanen said that Finland would rethink its security.

Vanhanen's cabinet proposed raising the retirement age from 63 to 65 years. His proposal was fiercely opposed by the Central Organisation of Finnish Trade Unions (Finnish acronym SAK), which is affiliated with the SDP.

In December 2009, Vanhanen announced that he would step down as chair of the Centre Party at its June 2010 convention. Mari Kiviniemi was chosen to the position and she also inherited the position as Prime Minister. In September 2010 Vanhanen started as the head of the Family Business Network Finland and left the parliament.

In 2010, the Finnish police investigated whether Vanhanen had been wrong not to disqualify himself in certain cabinet decisions on financial contributions to an organisation affiliated with the Centre Party, which had previously financed Vanhanen's presidential campaign. Because the charges concerned Vanhanen's actions while in office, the decision whether he should be prosecuted fell to the Constitutional Law Committee of the Finnish Parliament. The Committee decided not to prosecute Vanhanen.

Return to politics
In November 2014, Vanhanen announced that he would leave the Family Business Network. He was elected to the parliament in the 2015 elections with 11,304 personal votes. In June 2015, Vanhanen was chosen as the chairman of the Centre Party parliamentary group.

In March 2016, Vanhanen announced that he is seeking Centre Party's candidacy in 2018 presidential election. As no challengers appeared within the party, Vanhanen was the sole candidate in June's party conference and was confirmed as the Centre Party's candidate in the presidential election. Vanhanen said that his candidacy is motivated by the support he felt he had around the country during his last campaign and the will to improve the security situation in the areas surrounding Finland. Following the nomination, Vanhanen left his duties as the chairman of the parliamentary group in order to focus on global affairs. On 23 June 2016, Vanhanen was chosen as the chairman of the Foreign Affairs Committee in the Parliament. In the first round of the presidential election, Vanhanen placed fifth with 4.1 percent of the votes, while the incumbent president Sauli Niinistö went on to secure his second term with a majority of votes.

After getting re-elected in 2019 parliamentary election, Vanhanen was elected as the Speaker of the Parliament.

In June 2020, after Katri Kulmuni's resignation, Vanhanen was appointed Minister of Finance. Though he initially didn't want to accept the offer, he changed his mind and accepted out of a sense of duty. In May 2021 Vanhanen announced his resignation from the post to hand it over to party chair Annika Saarikko.

Personality

Vanhanen has been characterised as uncharismatic and even boring, which he has attempted to turn to his advantage in tense political situations. Vanhanen is known for being a teetotaler, saying that he does not like the taste of alcohol.

Matti Vanhanen was against the independence movement in the Baltic States during the 1980s. In his column in Suomenmaa in 1985, Vanhanen condemned the Baltic independence movement both for "wishing to change the Soviet system" and for "indifference towards the post Second World War reality." Vanhanen claimed that the difference between capitalism and socialism was not significant; and that instead of being concerned about the Soviet system, it would be better to concentrate, for example, on the research of Finno-Ugric languages.

In 2009, he visited China and credited the government for being systematic, as well as being able to place clear priorities and to mobilise the required resources to accomplish them. In his opinion, the Western world ought to note the example of China, where policies are implemented rapidly and effectively. He said he was impressed of the progress the country has made in dealing with difficult issues.

Vanhanen married Merja Vanhanen in 1985. They have two children: Annastiina (born 1991) and Juhana (born 1994). Matti Vanhanen and Merja Vanhanen unexpectedly announced their divorce on 6 April 2005.

After his divorce, he dated Susan Kuronen (she later changed her last name to Ruusunen). In February 2007, Kuronen released a tell-all book The Prime Minister's Bride, which actually boosted the prime minister's popularity with the public. Tens of thousands of Finns signed an online petition against the book and some bookstores refused to put it on the shelf. Vanhanen sued the book's publisher (but not Kuronen) for invasion of privacy in March 2007, following the March elections. In 2010 the Supreme Court of Finland upheld the privacy violation conviction against Susan Ruusunen and her publisher.

After ending his dating relationship with Kuronen (Ruusunen), Vanhanen got engaged to Sirkka Mertala in 2009. This relationship ended in 2010.

In a 2006 book commissioned for the presidential elections, Se on ihan Matti, Vanhanen compared the Finnish tabloid press to the KGB and Stasi, former Soviet Union and East German secret police agencies.

Vanhanen has two homes; he lives permanently in Lepsämä, a rural village in the Nurmijärvi municipality, but on weekends in the town of Rauma.

Vanhanen is about 198 cm (6'6"). He is left-handed.

Cabinets
 Vanhanen I Cabinet
 Vanhanen II Cabinet

See also
 Keskusta

References

External links

  Official site

|-

|-

|-

|-

|-

1955 births
Living people
Candidates for President of Finland
Centre Party (Finland) politicians
Finnish bloggers
Members of the Parliament of Finland (1991–95)
Members of the Parliament of Finland (1995–99)
Members of the Parliament of Finland (1999–2003)
Members of the Parliament of Finland (2003–07)
Members of the Parliament of Finland (2007–11)
Members of the Parliament of Finland (2015–19)
Members of the Parliament of Finland (2019–23)
Deputy Prime Ministers of Finland
Ministers of Defence of Finland
Ministers of Finance of Finland
People from Jyväskylä
Presidents of the European Council
Prime Ministers of Finland
Recipients of the Order of the Cross of Terra Mariana, 1st Class
Speakers of the Parliament of Finland
University of Helsinki alumni